Reginald Biddings King (born February 14, 1957) is a retired American professional basketball player. Born in Birmingham, Alabama, he was a 6'6" and 225 lb forward and played college basketball at the University of Alabama. He had a career in the National Basketball Association (NBA) from 1979 to 1985.  King's nickname in college was "the Mule."

King was selected 18th overall by the Kansas City Kings in the 1979 NBA draft. He spent four seasons with the Kings, and his final 2 NBA seasons with the Seattle SuperSonics. His best season was in 1980–81 as a member of the Kings when he averaged a career high 14.9 points, 9.7 rebounds and shot a career-best 54.4% from the field.

As of 2019, King still lives in the Kansas City area.

See also
List of NCAA Division I men's basketball players with 2000 points and 1000 rebounds

External links

1957 births
Living people
African-American basketball players
Alabama Crimson Tide men's basketball players
All-American college men's basketball players
American expatriate basketball people in Italy
American men's basketball players
Basketball players from Birmingham, Alabama
Kansas City Kings draft picks
Kansas City Kings players
Parade High School All-Americans (boys' basketball)
Seattle SuperSonics players
Small forwards
Viola Reggio Calabria players
21st-century African-American people
20th-century African-American sportspeople